Huib Ruijgrok (born 26 April 1944) is a Dutch former football coach. 

He coached Molde FK, Fredrikstad FK, De Graafschap, Schiedamse Voetbal Vereniging, and HBS Craeyenhout.

References

1944 births
Living people
Dutch football managers
Dutch expatriate football managers
Molde FK managers
Fredrikstad FK managers
De Graafschap managers
HBS Craeyenhout football managers
Expatriate football managers in Norway
Dutch expatriate sportspeople in Norway
SV SVV managers
Sportspeople from The Hague